Sar Kaj (also Romanized as Sar Kāj and Sarkaj) is a village in Natel Kenar-e Olya Rural District, in the Central District of Nur County, Mazandaran Province, Iran. At the 2006 census, its population was 583, in 125 families.

References 

Populated places in Nur County